The Jonathan Corwin House, known locally as The Witch House, is a historic house museum at 310 Essex Street in Salem, Massachusetts. It was the home of Judge Jonathan Corwin (1640–1718), and is the only structure still standing in Salem with direct ties to the Salem witch trials of 1692. Corwin bought the house in 1675 when he was 35, and lived there for more than 40 years; the house remained in the Corwin family until the mid-19th century.

History
Corwin was called upon to investigate the claims of diabolical activity when a surge of witchcraft accusations arose in Salem Village (now Danvers) and neighboring communities. He took the place of Judge Nathaniel Saltonstall, who resigned after the execution of Bridget Bishop. Corwin served on the Court of Oyer and Terminer, which ultimately sent 19 people to the gallows.

The house is an excellent example of 17th-century New England architecture, although historians are unsure of the date when it was built. Corwin family lore maintains that it was built in 1642, but some scholars claim that it was built in the 1620s or 1630s and that Roger Williams lived in it in the before he founded Providence Plantations.

It was restored to look as it would have in the 17th century and the gambrel roof was altered. It is now a museum operated by the City of Salem and is open seasonally. In 2011, the Ghost Adventures crew featured it during season 4.

Gallery

See also
List of historic houses in Massachusetts
List of the oldest buildings in Massachusetts
List of the oldest buildings in the United States

References

External links 

Salem Web – information on the Witch House

Houses completed in 1675
Historic house museums in Massachusetts
Salem witch trials
Museums in Salem, Massachusetts
Houses in Salem, Massachusetts
Historic districts in Essex County, Massachusetts
Reportedly haunted locations in Massachusetts
Historic district contributing properties in Massachusetts
National Register of Historic Places in Salem, Massachusetts
1675 establishments in Massachusetts
Houses on the National Register of Historic Places in Essex County, Massachusetts
Witchcraft museums